The discography of Verbal consists of 1 studio album released under Rhythm Zone, plus many featured singles and album tracks. Verbal is occasionally credited as L Universe (when working as a part of Hydeout Production), L12 (a collaboration unit with Daisuke Imai), Toss&Turn (a collaboration unit with Giorgio Cancemi) and The Funky President (when collaborating with Mic Banditz).

Studio albums

Singles

Featured singles

Other appearances
All songs feature Verbal's vocals, as well as his songwriting. Songs performed as a part of M-Flo, Teriyaki Boyz and MC Banditz are not featured in the list.

1999–2003

2004–2009

2009–present

Songwriting credits

This list features songs where Verbal has only contributed lyrics, music or production, as opposed to songs which feature him as a vocalist as well.

References

Discographies of Japanese artists
Rhythm and blues discographies
M-Flo